Dewi Morris Bridges  (18 November 1933 – 18 May 2015) was a Welsh Anglican bishop. He was the Bishop of Swansea and Brecon from 1988 until 1998.
Bridges was born in Beaufort in Brecknockshire on 18 November 1933. He was educated at the St David's College, Lampeter and Corpus Christi College, Cambridge, and was ordained after a period of study at Westcott House, Cambridge in 1957.

Career
He held curacies at Rhymney and Chepstow (1960–63) after which he was Vicar of St James’, Tredegar. From 1965 to 1969 he was a Lecturer at Summerfield College of Education, Kidderminster, and then Vicar of Kempsey. Later he was Rural Dean of Narberth and then Archdeacon of St David's, before his elevation to the episcopate in 1988.

Death
He died on 18 May 2015. His funeral was held on 29 May 2015, at St Mary's Church, Tenby, Wales.

References

1933 births
People from Brecknockshire
Alumni of the University of Wales, Lampeter
Alumni of Corpus Christi College, Oxford
Archdeacons of St Davids
Bishops of Swansea and Brecon
20th-century bishops of the Church in Wales
2015 deaths
Alumni of Westcott House, Cambridge